Sodium tetrachloropalladate is an inorganic compound with the chemical formula Na2PdCl4. This salt, and the analogous alkali metal salts of the form M2PdCl4, may be prepared simply by reacting palladium(II) chloride with the appropriate alkali metal chloride in aqueous solution. Palladium(II) chloride is insoluble in water, whereas the product dissolves:

 PdCl2 + 2 MCl → M2PdCl4

The compound crystallizes from water as trihydrate (Na2PdCl4·3H2O, reddish-brown powder with molar mass 348.22), which is the commercially available form.

This compound may further react with phosphines to give phosphine complexes of palladium.

An alternative method of preparing such phosphine complexes is to break up the coordination polymer of palladium(II) chloride into reactive, monomeric acetonitrile or benzonitrile complexes,
followed by reaction with phosphines.

References

Palladium compounds
Sodium compounds
Chloro complexes
Chlorometallates